Megalopyge affinis is a moth of the family Megalopygidae. It was described by Herbert Druce in 1887. It is found in Mexico.

The forewings and hindwings are uniform cream white with a few black scales along the margin of the hindwings. The head, thorax and abdomen are cream white.

References

Moths described in 1887
Megalopygidae